Dunalastair (Scottish Gaelic: Dùn Alastair, meaning "fort of Alexander") is an estate in the southern part of the Highlands, in Perthshire, Scotland.  It is 18 miles west of the town of Pitlochry, lying along the River Tummel between Tummel Bridge to the east and Kinloch Rannoch to the west, and incorporates part of Dunalastair Loch/Reservoir.

Dunalastair was the home of the Clan Robertson (or Duncan, or Donnachaidh) of Scotland, which includes names such as Robertson, Duncan and Reid. This family lived there until the 1850s, and there is a burial ground of the chiefs of the Clan in the grounds. There is the ruin of an old baronial-style mansion in the grounds, built in 1862 by General Macdonald, the then-owner of Dunalastair. The original tower house was burnt down after the 1745 rebellion, as the great chieftain Alexander Robertson of Struan was a Jacobite supporter.  Another house built on the site was demolished by General Macdonald in order to build the current building. 

The estate is overlooked by the peak of Schiehallion, a conical mountain sometimes translated as "Fairy hill of the Caledonians".

References

Buildings and structures in Perth and Kinross